North Minahasa Regency is a regency in North Sulawesi, Indonesia. Its capital is Airmadidi. It was originally part of the Minahasa Regency until it was established as a separate regency on 20 November 2003. It covers an area of 1,059.24 km2, and had a population of 188,904 at the 2010 Census; this had risen to 224,993 at the 2020 Census. The Regency includes the offshore islands of Bangka (Pulau Bangka) and Talisei (Pulau Talise) to the north of Sulawesi, and Mantenang (Pulau Mantehage) and Naeng Besar (Pulau Nain Besar) to the northwest.

Administration 
The regency is divided into ten districts (kecamatan), tabulated below with their areas and their populations from the 2010 Census and the 2020 Census. The table also includes the location of the administrative centre and the number of administrative villages (rural desa and urban kelurahan) in each district, and its postal codes.

Notes: (a) including 10 small offshore islands. (b) including offshore islands of Mantehage, Nain Besar, Nain Kecil, Bulu, Makelehi and Paniki to the west. (c) including offshore islands of Talisei, Kelapa Dua and 10 smaller to the north. (d) including offshore islands of Bangka and 18 smaller to the north.

References

Regencies of North Sulawesi